Azadegan (also Romanized as Āzādegān; also known as Qāţerchī) is a village in Nazluchay Rural District, Nazlu District, Urmia County, West Azerbaijan Province, Iran. At the 2006 census, its population was 271, in 82 families.

References 

Populated places in Urmia County